Solon Township may refer to:

Solon Township, Kent County, Michigan
Solon Township, Leelanau County, Michigan
Solon Township, Hettinger County, North Dakota, in Hettinger County, North Dakota
Solon Township, Cuyahoga County, Ohio, defunct

See also 
Solun, Horqin Right Front Banner, a township-level unit in China's Inner Mongolia
Solon (disambiguation)

Township name disambiguation pages